The 2017–18 Holstein Kiel season is the 118th season in the football club's history. Kiel are playing in the 2. Bundesliga for the first time since 1981, after finishing second in the 2016–17 3. Liga. They also are participating in this season's edition of the domestic cup, the DFB-Pokal. The season covers a period from 1 July 2017 to 30 June 2018.

Players

Squad information

Friendly matches

Competitions

Bundesliga

League table

Results summary

Results by round

Matches

DFB-Pokal

References

Holstein Kiel seasons
Kiel, Holstein